Toad River is a stream in the U.S. state of Minnesota.

Toad River is an English translation of the native Ojibwe language name.

See also
List of rivers of Minnesota

References

Rivers of Becker County, Minnesota
Rivers of Otter Tail County, Minnesota
Rivers of Minnesota